Renārs Kaupers (sometimes anglicised as Reynard Cowper; born 1 September 1974, in Jelgava) is a Latvian pop/rock singer, instrumentalist, and songwriter who is the vocalist of the band Prāta Vētra (known internationally as Brainstorm).

Biography
Kaupers graduated from University of Latvia in 1996 with a degree in journalism. He can speak at least three languages with fluency: English, Latvian, and Russian.

Kaupers' ancestors were probably Baron Friedrich von Stuart from Courland (1761–1842) and Immanuel Kant's niece Henrietta Kant.

He is the lead singer of the Latvian pop/rock band Brainstorm, which came third at the Eurovision Song Contest 2000 with their song "My Star". In 2001, Renārs received the Latvian Film Prize as the best actor for his role as Juziks in the film Vecās pagastmājas mistērija (The Mystery of the Old Parish House).

He hosted the Eurovision Song Contest 2003 in Riga, Latvia, with co-host Marija Naumova (stage name Marie N), and also hosted Congratulations, the Eurovision 50th anniversary concert in Copenhagen, Denmark, with Katrina Leskanich.

Kaupers' sons Edgars and Emīls run the indie-pop group Carnival Youth.

Decorations 
 2005 Fifth Class Order of the White Star of the Republic of Estonia.
 2008 Fourth Class Order of the Three Stars of the Republic of Latvia.

Filmography

Actor 
 Erik Kivisüda (aka Erik Stoneheart, 2022) as Versac (Estonia)
 Georg (2007) as Caesar (Estonia)
 Vecās pagastmājas mistērija (aka The Mystery of the Old Parish House, 2000) as Juziks (Latvia)

Soundtrack 
 Premiya Muz-TV 2008 (2008) (TV) (music: "Thunder Without Rain") (lyrics: "Thunder Without Rain") ... aka Премия Муз-ТВ 2008 (Russia) ... aka The Muz-TV Music Awards 2008 (International: English title: informal title)

Self 
 Premiya Muz-TV 2008 (2008) (TV) (as Brainstorm) .... Himself ... aka Премия Муз-ТВ 2008 (Russia) ... aka The Muz-TV Music Awards 2008 (International: English title: informal title)
 Congratulations: 50 Years of the Eurovision Song Contest (2005) (TV) .... Himself – Host
 Eirodziesma (2005) (TV) .... Special Guest
 The Eurovision Song Contest (2003) (TV) .... Host
 Eurolaul (2003) (TV) .... Member of the jury
 The Eurovision Song Contest (2001) (TV) .... Latvian vote presenter
 Eirodziesma (2000) (TV) .... Himself
 The Eurovision Song Contest (2000) (TV) (as Brainstorm) .... Latvian entry (3rd place)

See also 
 List of Eurovision Song Contest presenters

References

External links 

 Brainstorm website
 

1974 births
Living people
People from Jelgava
Latvian male film actors
21st-century Latvian male singers
Eurovision Song Contest entrants for Latvia
Eurovision Song Contest entrants of 2000
University of Latvia alumni
Lielais Kristaps Award winners
21st-century Latvian male actors
Recipients of the Order of the White Star, 5th Class